Each year, Virginia Tech holds commencement ceremonies at the end of the academic year in May, as well as at the end of the Fall semester in December.  Since 1990, a separate Graduate School Commencement Ceremony has been held to confer degrees to master's and doctoral students.  Fall commencement is held in Cassell Coliseum, and Spring Commencement is held in Lane Stadium.

University Commencement Speakers

References
 

Virginia Tech
Graduation
Lists of people by university or college in Virginia